The 2100 class is a class of diesel locomotives built by Clyde Engineering, Eagle Farm for Queensland Railways between 1970 and 1973.

History
The 2100 class were built to haul coals trains on the Goonyella railway line. Because the new line had been built to a heavier standard than existing Queensland Railways lines, the 2100 class weighed in at  fully laden, a  increase on that previously permissible. To allow them to operate over existing lines, the  tank had a compartment that could be blocked to bring their weight down to the required level.

The first 10 were financed by the developers of the Goonyella Riverside Mine, with another two purchased by Queensland Rail. Because the mine didn't open until 1971, the first deliveries entered service hauling Brisbane area freight and suburban passenger services. A further 12 were purchased for the Peak Downs Mine.

In the final few months of the diesel drawn passenger service, the Capricornian; [Operated 1970 - 1989 as diesel locomotive hauled service] the passenger service linked, Brisbane with the central Queensland city of Rockhampton; several 2100 class locomotives hauled these services. 2112 leading 2450 hauled the service on 16 May 1989. 2113 hauled the northbound working train number #3371 on 22 June 1989. 2114 was a subject of a filming event where the locomotive hauled the Capricornian on 13 June 1989 whilst being filmed on a parallel run with a Special Light Engine movement between Mayne and Northgate stations. 2115 departed Roma Street Station, in Brisbane for the north bound run on 15 May 1989. On 15 June 1989, 2116 hauled the Rockhampton bound service. 2117 made two appearances on the Capricornian in the final weeks. On 19 May 1989, 2117 hauled train number #3371, the Capricornian headed north out of Roma Street Station. The final diesel drawn Capricornian service on 30 June 1989 was hauled by 2117 on the overnight run to Rockhampton arriving on 1 July 1989.

In the early 2000s, many were withdrawn. In September 2001, ten were sold to Ferrocarril de Antofagasta a Bolivia, Chile, and one (2177) in August 2013 to South Africa. Five were transferred to Queensland Rail subsidiary Australian Railroad Group in Western Australia after being overhauled by Downer Rail at Port Pirie.

References

Aurizon diesel locomotives
Clyde Engineering locomotives
Co-Co locomotives
Diesel locomotives of Queensland
Queensland Rail locomotives
Railway locomotives introduced in 1970
Diesel-electric locomotives of Australia
3 ft 6 in gauge locomotives of Australia